The Montego 19 is an American trailerable sailboat that was designed by Johannes "Jopie" Helsen as a pocket cruiser and first built in 1976.

The Montego 19 was developed into the fixed keel Montego 20.

Production
The design was built by Universal Marine in St. Petersburg, Florida, United States from 1976 until 1985, but it is now out of production.

Design
The Montego 19 is a recreational keelboat, built predominantly of fiberglass, with wood trim. It has a fractional sloop rig, a raked stem, a plumb transom, a transom-hung rudder controlled by a tiller and a retractable swing keel. It displaces  and carries  of iron ballast.

The boat is normally fitted with a small  outboard motor for docking and maneuvering.

The design has sleeping accommodation for four people, with a double "V"-berth in the bow cabin and two straight settee berths in the main cabin. The galley is located on both sides, just aft of the bow cabin. The galley is equipped with a single-burner stove to port and sink to starboard. The head is located in the bow cabin, under the "V"-berth.

Operational history
In a January 1977 review in Cruising World, Betsy Hitz wrote, "new from Universal Marine is the trailerable Montego 19, designed by J. Jopie Helsen. The boat is described as having a 430-lb. retractable keel, and the manufacturer claims it is self-righting with keel up or down. Large, accessible hatches and generous berthing areas, characteristic of small Helsen cruisers, enable her to accommodate four: two in V-berths forward, and two in quarter berths. The 'no frills' cabin has no galley, but there is space for a portable head. There is full sitting headroom under the cabin trunk, and Helsen says, 'The forward hatch is situated to allow one to stand and pull his britches up.'..."

In a 2010 review Steve Henkel wrote, "this is a boat designed for the weekend sailor who wants to trailer-sail alone or with a companion, plus perhaps a couple of small children. She is relatively easy to sail, though her lack of controls (no vang, Cunningham, reef points, etc.) limits performance, and so limits the fun of attaining maximum speed in any wind conditions by easing this string and tightening that one ... Best features: The boat is relatively heavily built, judging by her notably higher 'bare' weight compared to comps when ballast weight is subtracted. That could make her less subject to damage, say, in a collision. Worst features: Her heavy iron keel is exposed to submerged hazards even when in the raised position. When lowered, the keel can damage its fiberglass housing, perhaps causing a serious leak, if struck a blow to the side."

See also
List of sailing boat types

Related development
Montego 20

References

External links
Photo of a Montego 19

Keelboats
1970s sailboat type designs
Sailing yachts
Trailer sailers
Sailboat type designs by Johannes "Jopie" Helsen
Sailboat types built by Universal Marine